Otto Schniewind (14 December 1887 – 26 March 1964) was a German General Admiral during World War II. He was a recipient of the Knight's Cross of the Iron Cross of Nazi Germany.

Career
Schniewind entered the Kaiserliche Marine in 1907 as a cadet. During the First World War he served as a commander of torpedoboats. When the German fleet surrendered to the British he commanded a squadron of torpedo boats, with this he partook in the Scuttling of the German fleet in Scapa Flow, after which he was taken prisoner by the British.

After being released Schniewind continued to serve in the Marinebrigade Ehrhardt and later the Reichsmarine. From 1925 to 1926 he served as adjutant to the Minister of War Otto Gessler. In 1932 Schniewind became captain of the light cruiser Köln. In 1934 Schniewind was appointed to another staff function. He was promoted to Konteradmiral (rear admiral) in 1937 and to Vizeadmiral (vice admiral) in 1940.

He served as Chief of Staff of the Seekriegsleitung from 1938 to 1941. After the sinking of the Bismarck Schniewind was appointed as successor to Günther Lütjens as the fleet commander of the Kriegsmarine after Lütjens was lost with his ship. In 1943, his position was renamed Marinegruppenkommando Nord und Flottenchef. On 1 March 1944 Schniewind was promoted to Generaladmiral. On 30 July 1944, Schniewind was relieved of command and for the duration of the war he saw no further employment.

After the War he was arrested and prosecuted during the High Command Trial for his role in the invasion of Norway (Operation Weserübung) but he was acquitted, after which he was released from captivity. From 1949 to 1952 he served with the Naval Historical Team in Bremerhaven.

Awards
 Iron Cross (1914)  1st Class (5 January 1918)
 Order of the Sword, Commander 2nd Class (Sweden) (30 June 1936)
 Wehrmacht Long Service Award 4th to 1st Class (2 October 1936)
 Order of St. Sava 2nd Class (1 June 1939) (Yugoslavia)
 Order of the Crown of Italy, Grand Officer (23 September 1939)
 Order of Naval Merit (Spain) in White (21 August 1939)
 Clasp to the Iron Cross (1939) 2nd and 1st Class
 Knight's Cross of the Iron Cross on 20 April 1940 as Vizeadmiral and chief of staff of the Seekriegsleitung in the OKM
 Order of the Sacred Treasure 1st Class (Japan)

References

Citations

Bibliography

 

 

1887 births
1964 deaths
Imperial German Navy personnel of World War I
Reichsmarine personnel
General admirals of the Kriegsmarine
Recipients of the Knight's Cross of the Iron Cross
Commanders of the Order of the Sword
Great Officers of the Order of St. Sava
Crosses of Naval Merit
Recipients of the Order of the Sacred Treasure, 1st class
People acquitted by the United States Nuremberg Military Tribunals
People from Saarlouis
People from the Rhine Province
Recipients of the clasp to the Iron Cross, 1st class
Naval Historical Team members
20th-century Freikorps personnel
Military personnel from Saarland